Glyphipterix molybdastra is a moth in the  family Glyphipterigidae. It is known from Angola.

Larvae have been recorded feeding on decaying vegetable matter.

References

Endemic fauna of Angola
Glyphipterigidae
Insects of Angola
Moths of Africa
Moths described in 1923